BD+48 738 b is an exoplanet that orbits the star BD +48 738. It has an orbital period of 393 days and a mass similar to that of Jupiter. It was discovered using the radial velocity method in 2011.

References 
 https://arxiv.org/abs/1110.1641
 https://exoplanets.nasa.gov/exoplanet-catalog/6565/bd48-738-b/
 http://exoplanet.eu/catalog/bd+48_738_b/
 http://www.openexoplanetcatalogue.com/planet/BD%2B48%20738%20b/
 https://exoplanetarchive.ipac.caltech.edu/overview/BD%2048%20738#planet_BD-48-738-b_collapsible
 http://allplanets.ru/star.php?star=BD+48%20738

Exoplanets discovered in 2011
Exoplanets detected by radial velocity